Vaihingen station may refer to:

Stuttgart-Vaihingen station, Stuttgart
Vaihingen (Enz) station, Vaihingen an der Enz